Eda glasbruk is a locality situated in Eda Municipality, Värmland County, Sweden with 233 inhabitants in 2010.

History 
In 1835 a glass factory was started at the place that later would be known as Eda glasbruk. The factory was closed in 1953. Eda glasbruk is known for the carnival glass produced there between 1925 and 1929, but also for glass designed by Gerda Strömberg.

References 

Populated places in Värmland County
Populated places in Eda Municipality